Hammersmith Creek was an outflow river of the Stamford Brook, and used to run through what is now King Street, into the Thames at the present-day site of Furnivall Gardens in Hammersmith.

Until the early 19th century the creek was navigable over this distance, and was the scene of much industry with malt houses and boatbuilders along the banks, as well as being a route for cargo transportation.

However, by the early 20th century the creek was no longer the site of such activity, and it was filled in 1936 with Furnivall Gardens being built on the location in 1951. Today, only a small drainage tunnel visible over the wall at Furnivall Gardens remains as evidence of Hammersmith Creek.

See also

 Subterranean rivers of London
 Rivers of the United Kingdom

References

Rivers of London

he:סטמפורד (נחל)